Treasure Planet is a 2002 American animated science fiction action-adventure film produced by Walt Disney Feature Animation and distributed by Walt Disney Pictures. The 43rd Disney animated feature film, it is a science fiction adaptation of Robert Louis Stevenson's adventure novel Treasure Island (1883), and it is the third retelling of the story in an outer space setting, following Планетата на съкровищата (1982) and the miniseries Treasure Island in Outer Space (1987). It is the third Disney adaptation of the novel, following Treasure Island (1950) and Muppet Treasure Island (1996). In the film's setting, spaceships are powered by solar sails and resemble the 18th-century sailing vessels of the original Treasure Island. 

The film was co-written, co-produced and directed by John Musker and Ron Clements, and features the voices of Joseph Gordon-Levitt, Brian Murray, David Hyde Pierce, Martin Short,  Roscoe Lee Browne, Emma Thompson, Michael Wincott, Laurie Metcalf, and Patrick McGoohan (in his final film role). The musical score was composed by James Newton Howard, while a couple of songs were written and performed by John Rzeznik. It marks Clements and Musker's first non-musical film since The Great Mouse Detective (1986). The duo pitched the concept for the film at the same time, where they worked on another Disney animated feature, The Little Mermaid (1989). After they finished their work on Hercules (1997), development of the film officially began. It employs a novel technique of hand-drawn 2D traditional animation set atop 3D computer animation. With a budget of $140 million, it is the most expensive traditionally animated film to date.

Treasure Planet premiered in Paris, France and Cinerama Dome on November 6 and 17, 2002, and received a wide theatrical release on November 27. It was the first film to be released simultaneously in regular and IMAX theaters. The film was a box-office bomb, earning $38 million in the United States and Canada and $110 million worldwide, but received generally positive reviews from critics and audiences. It was nominated for Best Animated Feature at the 75th Academy Awards, but lost to Spirited Away (2001). The film has gained a cult following.

Plot 

On the planet Montressor, young Jim Hawkins is enchanted by stories of space pirate Captain Flint and his ability to strike suddenly and disappear without a trace, hiding his loot on the fabled "Treasure Planet". Twelve years later, Jim has grown into an aloof troublemaker after his father abandoned him when he was a child. He reluctantly helps his mother Sarah run the Benbow Inn, and is caught by police after recklessly skysurfing with a rocket-powered sailboard. A spaceship crashes near the inn, and the dying pilot, Billy Bones, gives Jim a sphere and warns him to "beware the cyborg". Pirates attack, burning down the inn, and Jim flees with his mother and their dog-like friend, Dr. Delbert Doppler. Jim discovers that the sphere contains a holographic star map, leading to the location of Treasure Planet, and decides to seek out the legendary fortune.

Doppler commissions the ship RLS Legacy, commanded by feline Captain Amelia and stone-skinned first mate Mr. Arrow. The motley crew is secretly led by half-robot cook John Silver, whom Jim suspects is the cyborg he was warned about. Sent to work in the galley, Jim is supervised by Silver and his shape-shifting pet, Morph, and they form a tenuous father-son relationship. When the ship encounters a supernova, Jim secures the crew's lifelines. As a black hole forms, ruthless insectoid crew member Scroop cuts Mr. Arrow's lifeline, sending him to his death. The ship rides the shock waves to safety, and Jim is framed for neglecting Arrow's lifeline, but is comforted by Silver.

Reaching the Treasure Planet, Jim discovers the crew are indeed pirates led by Silver, and a mutiny erupts. Doppler, Amelia, and Morph abandon ship, and Jim retrieves the map, while Silver cannot bring himself to shoot Jim, allowing him to escape with the others. The group is shot down, injuring Amelia, and discover that the map is Morph in disguise, with the real map still on the ship. The group meet B.E.N., an abandoned navigational robot with knowledge of Flint and his treasure, but missing much of his memory. Cornered by the pirates, Jim, Morph, and B.E.N. hijack a longboat and return to the Legacy to retrieve the map. Scroop attacks them, and the artificial gravity is disabled; Scroop attempts to cut Jim loose, but Jim kicks him overboard into deep space. Returning, they are caught by Silver and his crew, who have already captured Doppler and Amelia.

Silver forces Jim to use the map, directing them to a portal that opens to any location in the universe, allowing Flint to conduct his raids. They open the portal to the core of Treasure Planet, which is actually an ancient machine Flint commandeered to stow his treasure, but trip a hidden sensor. As the pirates collect the loot, Jim finds the skeletal remains of Flint, holding the missing component to B.E.N.'s cognitive computer. He reinserts it, and B.E.N. immediately recalls that Flint rigged the planet to explode upon the treasure's discovery. As the planet collapses, Silver attempts to escape with a boatload of treasure, but abandons it to save Jim. The survivors board the Legacy, which becomes damaged and unable to escape the planet in time. Jim rigs a makeshift sailboard and rides ahead, setting the portal to Montressor Spaceport as he and the others clear the planet's explosion.

Jim finds Silver below decks and allows him to escape, and Silver gives him Morph and a handful of treasure, to pay for rebuilding the inn, believing Jim will "rattle the stars". Sometime later, a party is hosted at the rebuilt Benbow Inn; Doppler and Amelia are married with children; B.E.N. has become a waiter at the inn; and Jim, matured under Silver's mentorship, has become an interstellar cadet. He looks to the skies and sees an image of Silver in the clouds.

Voice cast

 Joseph Gordon-Levitt as Jim Hawkins, an adolescent pining for adventure. Austin Majors voices Jim as a young child.
 Brian Murray as John Silver, a cyborg who leads the mutiny on the RLS Legacy.
 David Hyde Pierce as Dr. Delbert Doppler, an anthropomorphic dog and astronomer. He is a combination of Dr. Livesey and Squire Trelawney from Treasure Island.
 Emma Thompson as Captain Amelia, an anthropomorphic cat and the captain of the RLS Legacy. She is an analog to Captain Alexander Smollett in Treasure Island.
 Martin Short as B.E.N., a robot who has lost his memory and was abandoned on Treasure Planet by Captain Flint. His name is a reference to Treasure Islands Ben Gunn, on whom he is based.
 Roscoe Lee Browne as Mr. Arrow, Captain Amelia's first mate.
 Laurie Metcalf as Sarah Hawkins, Jim Hawkins' mother who runs the Benbow Inn.
 Dane Davis as Morph, a small pink creature that can morph into any form and is Silver's pet. He is comparable to the pet parrot owned by Silver in the original Treasure Island.
 Michael Wincott as Scroop, a vicious spider-/crab-like crewman on the RLS Legacy. He is a rough analog to Israel Hands in Treasure Island.
 Patrick McGoohan as Billy Bones, a sailor who owned the map to Treasure Planet.
 Peter Cullen (uncredited) as Captain Nathaniel Flint, a legendary space pirate seen at the beginning of the film.
 Tony Jay as the Narrator
 Jane Carr as Mrs. Dunwitty, one of the customers at the Benbow Inn.
 Corey Burton as Onus, a crew member of the RLS Legacy.

Production

Development 
Treasure Planet took roughly four and a half years to create, but the concept for Treasure Planet (which was called Treasure Island in Space at the time) was originally pitched by Ron Clements in 1985 at the "Gong Show" meeting wherein he and John Musker also pitched The Little Mermaid. The pitch was rejected by Michael Eisner, who knew Paramount Pictures was developing a Star Trek sequel with a Treasure Island angle (which eventually went unproduced). The idea was pitched again in 1989 following the release of The Little Mermaid, but the studio still expressed disinterest. Following the release of Aladdin, the idea was pitched for a third time, but Jeffrey Katzenberg, who was the chief of Walt Disney Studios at the time, "just wasn't interested" in the idea. Angered at the rejection, Clements and Musker approached Feature Animation chairman Roy E. Disney who backed the filmmakers and made his wishes known to Eisner, who in turn agreed that the studio should produce the movie. In 1995, their contract was re-negotiated to allow them to commence development on Treasure Planet when Hercules reached completion.   
 
Since Musker and Clements wanted to be able to move "the camera around a lot like Steven Spielberg or James Cameron," the delay in production was beneficial since "the technology had time to develop in terms of really moving the camera." Principal animation for the film began in 2000 with roughly 350 crew members working on it. In 2002, Roy Conli estimated that there were around 1,027 crew members listed in the screen credits with "about four hundred artists and computer artists, about a hundred and fifty musicians and another two hundred technologists". According to Conli, Clements wanted to create a space world that was "warm and had more life to it than you would normally think of in a science fiction film", as opposed to the "stainless steel, blue, smoke coming from the bowels of heavily pipe laden" treatment of science fiction. In order to make the film "fun" by creating more exciting action sequences and because they believed that having the characters wear space suits and helmets "would take all the romance out of it", the crew created the concept of the "Etherium," an "outer space filled with atmosphere" and the characters wear 18 century clothing much like in the original Treasure Island.

Several changes were made late in the production to the film. The prologue of the film originally featured an adult Jim Hawkins narrating the story of Captain Flint in first person, but the crew considered this to be too "dark" and felt that it lacked character involvement. The crew also intended for the film to include a sequence showing Jim working on his solar surfer and interacting with an alien child, which was intended to show Jim's more sensitive side and as homage to The Catcher in the Rye. Because of the intention to begin the film with a scene of Jim solar surfing, the sequence had to be cut.

Writing 
Writer Rob Edwards stated that "it was extremely challenging" to take a classic novel and set it in outer space, and that they did away with some of the science fiction elements ("things like the metal space ships and the coldness") early on. Edwards goes on to say that they "did a lot of things to make the film more modern" and that the idea behind setting the film in outer space was to "make the story as exciting for kids now as the book was for kids then".

With regard to adapting the characters from the book to film, Ron Clements mentioned that the Jim Hawkins in the book is "a very smart, very capable kid", but they wanted to make Jim start out as "a little troubled kid" who "doesn't really know who he is" while retaining the aforementioned characteristics from the original character. This change was made after Joe Ranft suggested the idea. The "mentor figures" for Jim Hawkins in the novel were Squire Trelawney and Dr. Livesey, whom John Musker described as "one is more comic and the other's very straight"; these two characters were fused into Dr. Doppler. Clements also mentions that though the father-son relationship between Jim Hawkins and John Silver was present "to some degree" in the book, they wanted to emphasize it more in the film.

Terry Rossio, who worked on the script, later argued the filmmakers made a crucial mistake turning Jim Hawkins into an adolescent. "Treasure Island, the book, is a boy's adventure, about a young cabin boy who matches wits with a crew of bloodthirsty pirates. All of the key scenes are made more dramatic by the fact that it's a young kid who is in danger... Treasure Planet made the kid into a young man. Which dilutes the drama of all the situations, start to finish... Instead of being an amazing and impressive kid, he became a petulant unimpressive teen."

Casting 

Casting director Ruth Lambert held a series of casting auditions for the film in New York, Los Angeles, and London, but the crew already had some actors in mind for two of the major characters. The character of Dr. Doppler was written with David Hyde Pierce in mind, and Pierce was given a copy of the Treasure Planet script along with preliminary sketches of the character and the film's scenic elements while he was working on Pixar's A Bug's Life (1998). He stated that "the script was fantastic, the look was so compelling" that he accepted the role. Jeff Goldblum and Hugh Grant were also considered before Pierce secured the part. Likewise, the character of Captain Amelia was developed with the idea that Emma Thompson would be providing her voice. "We offered it to her and she was really excited," Clements said. Musker said, "This is the first action adventure character that Emma has ever played and she was pregnant during several of the sessions. She was happy that she could do all this action and not have to train for the part" There were no actors initially in mind for the characters of John Silver and Jim Hawkins; Brian Murray (John Silver) and Joseph Gordon-Levitt (Jim Hawkins) were signed after months of auditions. Gordon-Levitt stated that he was attracted to the role because "it's a Disney animated movie and Disney animated movies are in a class by themselves," and that "to be part of that tradition is unbelievable to me". Musker mentioned that Gordon-Levitt "combined enough vulnerability and intelligence and a combination of youthfulness but incompleteness" and that they liked his approach. Patrick McGoohan was cast as Billy Bones at the suggestion of Corey Burton who played the smaller role of Onus in the film after having done an impression of him for a temp track. It marked his final acting role.

Among the big-name actors, only Pierce and Short had experience with voice acting prior to the making of Treasure Planet. Conli explained that they were looking for "really the natural voice of the actor", and that sometimes it was better to have an actor with no experience with voice work as he utilizes his natural voice instead of "affecting a voice". The voice sessions were mostly done without any interaction with the other actors, but Gordon-Levitt expressed a desire to interact with Murray because he found it difficult to act out most of the scenes between Jim Hawkins and John Silver alone.

Design 
[[Image:One More Step, Mr. Hands.jpg|thumb|upright=0.9|An illustration by N.C. Wyeth titled One More Step, Mr. Hands for a 1911 publication of Treasure Island. This type of illustration, which was described by the film crew as "classic storybook illustration," was the basis for Treasure Planet'''s overall look.]]
While designing for Treasure Planet, the crew operated on rule they call the "70/30 Law" (an idea that art director Andy Gaskill has credited to Ron Clements), which meant that the overall look of the film's artwork should be 70% traditional and 30% sci-fi. The overall look of Treasure Planet was based on the art style promoted by illustrators associated with the Brandywine School of Illustration (such as Howard Pyle and N.C. Wyeth), whose illustrations have been described by the film's crew as being the "classic storybook illustration," having a painterly feel to it, and being composed of a warm color palette.

There were around forty animators on the crew, and were further divided into teams; for example, sixteen animators were assigned to Jim Hawkins because he appeared on the screen the most, and twelve were assigned to John Silver. To ensure "solidity" in illustration and personality, each major character in the film had a team of animators led by one animation supervisor. Conli mentioned that the personalities of the supervisors affected the final character, citing Glen Keane (the supervisor for John Silver) as well as John Ripa (the supervisor for Jim Hawkins) as examples. The physical appearance, movements, and facial expressions of the voice actors were infused into the characters as well.

When asked if they drew inspiration from the previous film adaptations of Treasure Island for the character designs, Glen Keane said he disliked looking at previous portrayals of a character to "clear his mind of stereotypes", but that he drew some inspiration for the manner by which Silver spoke from actor Wallace Beery, whom he "loved because of the way he talked out of the side of his mouth." For the characterization and design for Jim Hawkins, John Ripa cited James Dean as an important reference because "there was a whole attitude, a posture" wherein "you felt the pain and the youthful innocence", and he also cited the film Braveheart because "there are a lot of close-ups on characters...who are going through thought processes, just using their eyes."

Animators also used maquettes, small statues of the characters in the film, as references throughout the animation process. Character sculptor Kent Melton mentioned that the first Disney film to use maquettes was Pinocchio (1940), and that this paved the way to the formation of an entire department devoted to character sculpting. Keane noted that maquettes are not just supposed to be "like a mannequin in a store", but rather has to be "something that tells you [the character's] personality" and that maquettes also helped inspire the way actors would portray their roles.

The animators took Deep Canvas, a technology which they had initially developed for Tarzan (1999), and came up with a process they called "Virtual Sets," wherein they created entire 360 degree sets before they began staging the scenes. They combined this process with traditionally-drawn characters in order to achieve a "painted image with depth perception" and enabled the crew to place the camera anywhere in the set and maneuver it as they would maneuver a camera for a live-action film. In order to test how a computer-generated body part (specifically John Silver's cyborg arm) would mesh with a traditionally animated character, the crew took a clip of Captain Hook from Peter Pan (1953) and replaced his arm with the cyborg arm.

 Animation  
One of the film's goals was to blend different mediums of animation into one film to have such a seamless finish to the point you could not tell the difference between what was two-dimensional hand drawing or computer-generated 3D animations and environments. For the animation of the Treasure Planet, there are three main elements that were essential to the production of this film. The traditional 2D character animation that Disney is known for, three-dimensional character animation, and the computer-generated or CG environments.

Music and sound

The "70/30 Law" of "70% traditional and 30% sci-fi" was not only applied to the visual designs for the film, but also for the sound effects and music. Sound designer Dane Davis mentioned that he and his team "scoured hobby shops and junk stores for antique windup toys and old spinning mechanisms" in order to create the sound effects for John Silver to "avoid sounding slick or sci-fi". The team did some experimentation with the sound used in dialogues, especially with the robot B.E.N., but opted to keep Short's natural voice because everything they tried "affected his comedy", and "the last thing you want to do in a story like this is affect performances".

The music from the film is largely orchestral in nature, although it includes two moderately successful pop singles ("I'm Still Here" and "Always Know Where You Are") from The Goo Goo Dolls frontman John Rzeznik and British pop-rock group, BBMak. Both songs were written and performed by John Rzeznik in the film, but BBMak recorded "Always Know Where You Are" for the soundtrack. The score was composed by James Newton Howard, who said that the score is "very much in the wonderful tradition of Korngold and Tiomkin and Steiner." The score has been described as a mixture of modern "classical style" music in the spirit of Star Wars and Celtic music. Scottish fiddler Alasdair Fraser is credited as the co-composer of the track "Silver Leaves", and is also listed as a soloist in the film's credits. Walt Disney Records released the film's soundtrack album on November 19, 2002. Jerry Goldsmith was also considered to compose the score.

 Marketing 
In April of 2002, a teaser trailer for Treasure Planet was officially released online. It would then debut in theaters within the next few weeks, starting with Spider-Man on May 3, 2002, followed by Star Wars: Episode II – Attack of the Clones two weeks later. Before and during its theatrical run, Treasure Planet had promotional support from McDonald's, Pepsi-Cola, Dreyer's, and Kellogg's. McDonald's included promotional items such as action figures and puzzles in their Happy Meals and Mighty Meals, Pepsi-Cola placed promotional film graphics onto the packaging of a number of their soft drinks (Mountain Dew, Code Red, Sierra Mist, Mug Root Beer, Orange Slice, and Lipton Brisk), Dreyer's used their delivery truck panels to promote ice cream flavors inspired by the film (such as "Galactic Chocolate" and "Vanilla Treasure"), and Kellog's included film-branded spoons in their cereal boxes. 

Hasbro released a lineup of Treasure Planet action figures and toys.

A novelization was published by Puffin Books.

 Release 

 Theatrical Treasure Planet held its world premiere in Paris, France on November 6, 2002. It premiered in the US at Cinerama Dome in Hollywood on November 17, 2002, The film is "the first major studio feature" to be released in regular and IMAX theaters simultaneously; this was done in the light of the success of Disney films that were re-released in IMAX format, such as Beauty and the Beast and Fantasia 2000. Dick Cook, then-chairman of Walt Disney Studios, expressed the hope that it would be a good way to distinguish themselves during the competitive holiday season.

Home mediaTreasure Planet was released on VHS and DVD in the United States and Canada by Walt Disney Home Entertainment on April 29, 2003. The DVD includes behind-the-scenes featurettes, a visual commentary, deleted scenes, teaser and theatrical trailers, the music video for the song "I'm Still Here" by John Rzeznik, and a virtual tour of the RLS Legacy. This THX certified release also contains an Easter egg in the Set Up menu. The viewer can highlight any listing and press right to reveal a clapperboard. Selecting this icon will reveal the DVD credits. The DVD retained the number one spot in Billboards top sales for two weeks and the VHS was number one in sales for three weeks. By July 2003, Treasure Planet brought in $64 million in DVD sales. 

It is officially the last Disney animated feature to be presented in fullscreen on its VHS release, as the VHS releases of Brother Bear (2003) and Home on the Range (2004) are presented in widescreen. However, the Disney Movie Club exclusive VHS release of Chicken Little (2005) is presented in fullscreen.

Disney released a 10th Anniversary special edition Blu-ray/DVD combo on July 3, 2012.

 Reception 
Box officeTreasure Planet would go down in history as one of the biggest animated box office bombs of all time. The film grossed over $12 million on its debut weekend, ranking at fourth place behind Harry Potter and the Chamber of Secrets, Die Another Day, and Disney's own The Santa Clause 2. During the five-day Thanksgiving holiday weekend, the film grossed just $16.5 million worldwide. The film ended up grossing $38.1 million domestically and $71.4 million internationally for a $109.5 million worldwide gross. Its failure became apparent early on, as Disney's Buena Vista Distribution arm reduced its fourth-quarter earnings by $47 million within a few days of the film's release. In 2014, the Los Angeles Times listed the film as one of the most expensive box office failures of all time.

Critical response
The site's critics consensus states "Though its characterizations are weaker than usual, Treasure Planet offers a fast-paced, beautifully rendered vision of outer space." Metacritic assigned the film a weighted average score of 60 out of 100 based on 30 reviews from mainstream critics, indicating "mixed or average reviews". Audiences polled by CinemaScore gave the film an average grade of "A–" on an A+ to F scale.

Stephen Hunter of The Washington Post, who gave it 4 stars out of 5, stated that the film "boasts the purest of Disney raptures: It unites the generations, rather than driving them apart". Leah Rozen of People stated that the film "has imagination, humor aplenty and moves briskly", and that "the animation, combining traditional and digital techniques, is ravishing." Claudia Puig of USA Today said that the film's most noteworthy feature is "the artful way it combines the futuristic and the retro", and went on to say that the film does not have the "charm of Lilo & Stitch" nor the "dazzling artistry of Spirited Away", but concluded that Treasure Planet is "a capable and diverting holiday season adventure for a family audience." Kim Hollis of Box Office Prophets stated that "there's plenty to recommend the film – the spectacular visuals alone make Treasure Planet a worthwhile watch," though expressing disappointment because she felt that the characters were "not all that creatively rendered".

Roger Ebert of the Chicago Sun-Times gave it 2.5 stars out of 4; he felt that a more traditional take on the story would have been "more exciting" and "less gimmicky". Andy Klein of Daily Variety Gotham complained about the script, describing it as "listless" and remarked, "If only its script were as amusing as its visuals." A. O. Scott of The New York Times described the film as "less an act of homage than a clumsy and cynical bit of piracy", and went on to say that it is "not much of a movie at all" and a "brainless, mechanical picture". Owen Gleiberman of Entertainment Weekly described the film as "all cutesy updated fripperies and zero momentum."

In 2012, Ricky Brigante of InsideTheMagic considered the film “may not hold up to the standards set by so many timeless musicals, (but) it’s an adventure that is worth seeing" praising it for its themes and characters. In 2020, Petrana Radulovic, writing for Polygon, praised the characters of Jim and Sliver, as well as the "I’m Still Here." sequence and stated, the film “is a visual delight, a time capsule of the early 2000s in a way that perhaps no other animated movie of the era is. It boldly, unapologetically pushes the visual limits of genre expectation in a way no Disney movie has since.”

Awards
The film was nominated for the Academy Award for Best Animated Feature along with Lilo & Stitch, Ice Age and Spirit: Stallion of the Cimarron, but all four films lost to Spirited Away (2001). It was also nominated for a number of Annie Awards.

Canceled franchise
Before Treasure Planet premiered in cinemas, Thomas Schumacher, then-president of Walt Disney Feature Animation, mentioned the possibilities of having direct-to-video releases for Treasure Planet as well as a television series. He stated that they already had "a story and some storyboards and concepts up and a script for what a sequel to [Treasure Planet] could be," and that they also had a "notion" of what the series would be.

Director Jun Falkenstein and screenwriter Evan Spiliotopoulos began early development on Treasure Planet 2. In the sequel, Jim Hawkins and Kate, his love interest and classmate at the Royal Interstellar Academy, must team with Long John Silver to stop the villainous Ironbeard from freeing the inmates of Botany Bay Prison Asteroid. Willem Dafoe was set to voice Ironbeard. Tommy Walter was asked to write and perform songs for the film. However, the sequel was canceled when Treasure Planet did poorly at the box office.

Following the box office failure of Atlantis: The Lost Empire (2001), Disneyland planned a second attempt to revive its Submarine Voyage ride with a Treasure Planet theme. These plans were scrapped due to the film experiencing the same financial performance as its predecessor. The attraction ultimately reopened in 2007 as the Finding Nemo Submarine Voyage, being themed to the 2003 Disney·Pixar animated film Finding Nemo.

 Video games 
Several Treasure Planet video games were released. In October 2002, Disney Interactive released the naval strategy game Treasure Planet: Battle at Procyon for the PC, while in November, Sony Computer Entertainment released two separate Treasure Planet 3D platform action video games for the PlayStation (developed by Magenta Software) and PlayStation 2 (developed by Bizarre Creations). Bizarre Creations used Softimage's XSI engine for modeling, texturing and animation, and released a Making-of video on their Facebook page in 2008. A Game Boy Advance game based on the film was also released.

A series of games collectively called Disney's Treasure Planet: Training Academy (or Disney's Treasure Planet Collection) was also released in 2002. It was composed of three games (Broadside Blast, Treasure Racer, and Etherium Rescue), and players with all three games could unlock a fourth game (Ship Shape).

 Reception 

The game was met with mixed to negative reception upon release. GameRankings and Metacritic gave it a score of 66.43% and 68 out of 100 for the Game Boy Advance version; 64% and 61 out of 100 for the PlayStation 2 version; and 57.14% and 44 out of 100 for the PlayStation version.

 Legacy 
On November 27, 2022, Disney D23 posted on Twitter: "It has been 20 years since Jim Hawkins rattled the stars in 
@DisneyAnimation's Treasure Planet! Happy anniversary to this stellar film!"  A limited commemorative pin was also released by the company for the anniversary as well as a Sketchbook Ornament. Many members of the crew who worked on the film including directors John Musker and Ron Clements as well as actor Corey Burton also celebrated its anniversary by doing a 3-hour livestream through several platforms in an event organized by fans of the film, which was planned in advance.

 See also 

 Treasure Island in Outer Space (Il Pianeta Del Tesoro or Treasure Planet), an Italian/German 1987 live-action adaptation of the classic novel with similar setting.
 Lost in Space'': "Treasure of the Lost Planet" (1967, 23rd episode of season 2), another interplanetary adventure loosely based on the same novel.

References

External links 

2002 films
2002 animated films
2000s English-language films
2002 science fiction films
American children's animated space adventure films
American children's animated science fiction films
American children's animated fantasy films
American teen films
Space pirates
Treasure Island films
American robot films
Animated films about extraterrestrial life
Animated films about robots
Animated science fiction films
2000s American animated films
2000s teen films
Cyborg films
Fiction about black holes
Walt Disney Animation Studios films
Walt Disney Pictures animated films
Films directed by John Musker
Films directed by Ron Clements
Films produced by John Musker
Films produced by Ron Clements
Films scored by James Newton Howard
Films with screenplays by John Musker
Films with screenplays by Ron Clements
Films with screenplays by Ted Elliott
Films with screenplays by Terry Rossio
Steampunk films
Treasure Planet
Films set on fictional planets
Films set in outer space
Films set on spacecraft
Animated films based on novels
Fiction about supernovae
Fictional places in Disney films